Shatterhand is a 1991 game for the Nintendo Entertainment System

Shatterhand may also refer to:
Dr. Guntram Shatterhand, an alias used by the James Bond villain, Ernst Stavro Blofeld
Shatterhand, a rumoured working title for the James Bond film No Time to Die
Old Shatterhand, a character in the American Wild West novels of Karl May
Old Shatterhand (film), a 1964 film based on Karl May's works
Villa Shatterhand, the Italian Renaissance residence of Karl May in Radebeul, Saxony